The Northern Post was a newspaper that operated from Aliwal North in the Cape Colony, in what is now modern South Africa, from 1874 to 1902.

References

Defunct newspapers published in South Africa
Publications established in 1874
Publications disestablished in 1902
1874 establishments in the Cape Colony
1902 disestablishments in the Cape Colony